The biomass is the mass of living biological organisms in a given area or ecosystem at a given time. Biomass can refer to species biomass, which is the mass of one or more species, or to community biomass, which is the mass of all species in the community. It can include microorganisms, plants or animals. The mass can be expressed as the average mass per unit area, or as the total mass in the community.

How biomass is measured depends on why it is being measured. Sometimes, the biomass is regarded as the natural mass of organisms in situ, just as they are. For example, in a salmon fishery, the salmon biomass might be regarded as the total wet weight the salmon would have if they were taken out of the water. In other contexts, biomass can be measured in terms of the dried organic mass, so perhaps only 30% of the actual weight might count, the rest being water. For other purposes, only biological tissues count, and teeth, bones and shells are excluded. In some applications, biomass is measured as the mass of organically bound carbon (C) that is present.

The total live biomass on Earth is about 550–560 billion tonnes C, and the total annual primary production of biomass is just over 100 billion tonnes C/yr. The total live biomass of bacteria may be as much as that of plants and animals or may be much less. Around 2020, anthropogenic mass (human-made material) is expected to exceed all living biomass on earth.

Ecological pyramids

An ecological pyramid is a graphical representation that shows, for a given ecosystem, the relationship between biomass or biological productivity and trophic levels.

 A biomass pyramid shows the amount of biomass at each trophic level.
 A productivity pyramid shows the production or turn-over in biomass at each trophic level.

An ecological pyramid provides a snapshot in time of an ecological community.

The bottom of the pyramid represents the primary producers (autotrophs). The primary producers take energy from the environment in the form of sunlight or inorganic chemicals and use it to create energy-rich molecules such as carbohydrates. This mechanism is called primary production. The pyramid then proceeds through the various trophic levels to the apex predators at the top.

When energy is transferred from one trophic level to the next, typically only ten percent is used to build new biomass. The remaining ninety percent goes to metabolic processes or is dissipated as heat. This energy loss means that productivity pyramids are never inverted, and generally limits food chains to about six levels. However, in oceans, biomass pyramids can be wholly or partially inverted, with more biomass at higher levels.

Terrestrial biomass

Terrestrial biomass generally decreases markedly at each higher trophic level (plants, herbivores, carnivores). Examples of terrestrial producers are grasses, trees and shrubs. These have a much higher biomass than the animals that consume them, such as deer, zebras and insects. The level with the least biomass are the highest predators in the food chain, such as foxes and eagles.

In a temperate grassland, grasses and other plants are the primary producers at the bottom of the pyramid. Then come the primary consumers, such as grasshoppers, voles and bison, followed by the secondary consumers, shrews, hawks and small cats. Finally the tertiary consumers, large cats and wolves. The biomass pyramid decreases markedly at each higher level.

Changes in plant species in the terrestrial ecosystem can result in changes in the biomass of soil decomposer communities. Biomass in C3  and C4 plant species can change in response to altered concentrations of CO2. C3 plant species have been observed to increase in biomass in response to increasing concentrations of CO2 of up to 900 ppm.

Ocean biomass

Ocean or marine biomass, in a reversal of terrestrial biomass, can increase at higher trophic levels. In the ocean, the food chain typically starts with phytoplankton, and follows the course:
Phytoplankton → zooplankton → predatory zooplankton → filter feeders → predatory fish

Phytoplankton are the main primary producers at the bottom of the marine food chain. Phytoplankton use photosynthesis to convert inorganic carbon into protoplasm. They are then consumed by zooplankton that range in size from a few micrometers in diameter in the case of protistan microzooplankton to macroscopic gelatinous and crustacean zooplankton.

Zooplankton comprise the second level in the food chain, and includes small crustaceans, such as copepods and krill, and the larva of fish, squid, lobsters and crabs.

In turn, small zooplankton are consumed by both larger predatory zooplankters, such as krill, and by forage fish, which are small, schooling, filter-feeding fish. This makes up the third level in the food chain.

A fourth trophic level can consist of predatory fish, marine mammals and seabirds that consume forage fish. Examples are swordfish, seals and gannets.

Apex predators, such as orcas, which can consume seals, and shortfin mako sharks, which can consume swordfish, make up a fifth trophic level. Baleen whales can consume zooplankton and krill directly, leading to a food chain with only three or four trophic levels.

Marine environments can have inverted biomass pyramids. In particular, the biomass of consumers (copepods, krill, shrimp, forage fish) is larger than the biomass of primary producers. This happens because the ocean's primary producers are tiny phytoplankton which are r-strategists that grow and reproduce rapidly, so a small mass can have a fast rate of primary production. In contrast, terrestrial primary producers, such as forests, are K-strategists that grow and reproduce slowly, so a much larger mass is needed to achieve the same rate of primary production.

Among the phytoplankton at the base of the marine food web are members from a phylum of bacteria called cyanobacteria. Marine cyanobacteria include the smallest known photosynthetic organisms. The smallest of all, Prochlorococcus, is just 0.5 to 0.8 micrometres across. In terms of individual numbers, Prochlorococcus is possibly the most plentiful species on Earth: a single millilitre of surface seawater can contain 100,000 cells or more. Worldwide, there are estimated to be several octillion (1027) individuals. Prochlorococcus is ubiquitous between 40°N and 40°S and dominates in the oligotrophic (nutrient poor) regions of the oceans. The bacterium accounts for an estimated 20% of the oxygen in the Earth's atmosphere, and forms part of the base of the ocean food chain.

Bacterial biomass
There are typically 50 million bacterial cells in a gram of soil and a million bacterial cells in a millilitre of fresh water. In a much-cited study from 1998, the world bacterial biomass had been mistakenly calculated to be 350 to 550 billions of tonnes of carbon, equal to between 60% and 100% of the carbon in plants. More recent studies of seafloor microbes cast considerable doubt on that; one study in 2012 reduced the calculated microbial biomass on the seafloor from the original 303 billions of tonnes of C to just 4.1 billions of tonnes of C, reducing the global biomass of prokaryotes to 50 to 250 billions of tonnes of C. Further, if the average per-cell biomass of prokaryotes is reduced from 86 to 14 femtograms C, then the global biomass of prokaryotes was reduced to 13 to 44.5 billions of tonnes of C, equal to between 2.4% and 8.1% of the carbon in plants.

As of 2018, there continues to be some controversy over what the global bacterial biomass is. A census published by the PNAS in May 2018 gives for bacterial biomass ~70 billions of tonnes of carbon, equal to 15% of the whole biomass. A census by the Deep Carbon Observatory project published in December 2018 gives a smaller figure of up to 23 billion tonnes of carbon.

Global biomass

Estimates for the global biomass of species and higher level groups are not always consistent across the literature. The total global biomass has been estimated at about 550 billion tonnes C. Most of this biomass is found on land, with only 5 to 10 billion tonnes C found in the oceans. On land, there is about 1,000 times more plant biomass (phytomass) than animal biomass (zoomass). About 18% of this plant biomass is eaten by the land animals. However, in the ocean, the animal biomass is nearly 30 times larger than the plant biomass. Most ocean plant biomass is eaten by the ocean animals.

Humans compose about 100 million tonnes of the Earth's dry biomass, domesticated animals about 700 million tonnes, earthworms over 1,100 million tonnes, and annual cereal crops about 2.3 billion tonnes.

The most successful animal species, in terms of biomass, may well be Antarctic krill, Euphausia superba, with a fresh biomass approaching 500 million tonnes. As a group, the family of lanternfish are among the most populous vertebrates, with some estimates suggesting that they may have a total global biomass of 550–660 million tonnes, accounting for up to 65% of all deep-sea fish biomass. However, as a group, the small aquatic invertebrates called copepods may form the largest animal biomass on earth. A 2009 paper in Science estimates, for the first time, the total world fish biomass as somewhere between 0.8 and 2.0 billion tonnes. It has been estimated that about 1% of the global biomass is due to phytoplankton.

According to a 2020 study published in Nature, human-made materials, or anthropogenic mass, outweigh all living biomass on earth, with plastic alone exceeding the mass of all land and marine animals combined.

Global rate of production

Net primary production is the rate at which new biomass is generated, mainly due to photosynthesis. Global primary production can be estimated from satellite observations. Satellites scan the normalised difference vegetation index (NDVI) over terrestrial habitats, and scan sea-surface chlorophyll levels over oceans. This results in 56.4 billion tonnes C/yr (53.8%), for terrestrial primary production, and 48.5 billion tonnes C/yr for oceanic primary production. Thus, the total photoautotrophic primary production for the Earth is about 104.9 billion tonnes C/yr. This translates to about 426 gC/m2/yr for land production (excluding areas with permanent ice cover), and 140 gC/m2/yr for the oceans.

However, there is a much more significant difference in standing stocks—while accounting for almost half of total annual production, oceanic autotrophs account for only about 0.2% of the total biomass. Autotrophs may have the highest global proportion of biomass, but they are closely rivaled or surpassed by microbes.

Terrestrial freshwater ecosystems generate about 1.5% of the global net primary production.

Some global producers of biomass in order of productivity rates are

See also 

  
 
 Biomass partitioning
 
 
 
 
  - a biomass manipulation study

References

Further reading

External links

The mass of all life on Earth is staggering — until you consider how much we’ve lost
Counting bacteria
Trophic levels
Biomass distributions for high trophic-level fishes in the North Atlantic, 1900–2000

Ecology terminology
Environmental terminology
Ecological metrics
Ecosystems
Fisheries science